The 2021 FIVB Volleyball Boys' U19 World Championship was the 17th edition of the FIVB Volleyball Boys' U19 World Championship, contested by the men's national teams under the age of 19 of the members of the FIVB, the sport's global governing body. The tournament was held in Iran from 24 August to 2 September 2021.

Italy were the defending champions, having won their second title in Tunisia.

Players must be born on or after 1 January 2003.

Qualification
A total of 20 teams will qualify for the final tournament. In addition to Iran who qualified automatically as hosts, the other 19 teams will qualify from five separate continental competitions.

* Japan, South Korea, Chinese Taipei, United States and Puerto Rico withdrew from the competition. Thailand entered by the 5th place at the Asian Volleyball Championship and the other teams entered by the world ranking.

1.On 14 December 2020, AVC announced that the 2020 Asian Championship which was originally the AVC qualifier for the tournament was canceled due to COVID-19 pandemic and the top four teams of the 2018 Asian Championship which had not yet qualified to the tournament qualified as the AVC representatives.
2.On 30 November 2020, NORCECA announced that the 2020 NORCECA Championship which was originally the NORCECA qualifier for the tournament was canceled due to COVID-19 pandemic and the top four teams of the NORCECA Ranking as of January 2020 qualified as the NORCECA representatives.

Pools composition

Squads

Venues

Pool standing procedure
 Number of matches won
 Match points
 Sets ratio
 Points ratio
 If the tie continues as per the point ratio between two teams, the priority will be given to the team which won the last match between them. When the tie in points ratio is between three or more teams, a new classification of these teams in the terms of points 1, 2 and 3 will be made taking into consideration only the matches in which they were opposed to each other.

Match won 3–0 or 3–1: 3 match points for the winner, 0 match points for the loser
Match won 3–2: 2 match points for the winner, 1 match point for the loser

Preliminary round
All times are Iran Daylight Time (UTC+04:30).

Pool A

|}
* Guatemala was forced to withdraw after several team members tested positive for COVID-19 and their games were forfeited.

|}

Pool B

|}

|}

Pool C

|}

|}

Pool D

|}
* Dominican Republic was forced to withdraw after several team members tested positive for COVID-19 and their games were forfeited.

|}

Final round
All times are Iran Daylight Time (UTC+04:30).

17th–18th places

|}

|}

Final sixteen

Round of 16

|}

9th–16th quarterfinals

|}

Quarterfinals

|}

13th–16th semifinals

|}

9th–12th semifinals

|}

5th–8th semifinals

}}

|}

Semifinals

|}

13th place match

|}

11th place match

|}

9th place match

|}

7th place match

|}

5th place match

|}

3rd place match

|}

Final

|}

Final standings

Awards

Most Valuable Player
 Tytus Nowik
Best Setter
 Stoil Palev
Best Outside Spikers
 Aleksandar Nikolov
 Kamil Szymendera

Best Middle Blockers
 Yousef Kazemi
 Jakub Majchrzak
Best Opposite Spiker
 Tytus Nowik
Best Libero
 Kuba Hawryluk

Statistics leaders

All round
Statistics leaders correct as of All round.

See also
2021 FIVB Volleyball Girls' U18 World Championship

References

External links
Official website

FIVB Volleyball Boys' U19 World Championship
FIVB U19 World Championship
FIVB
FIVB Volleyball Boys' U19 World Championship
FIVB Volleyball Boys' U19 World Championship